The Prize may refer to:
 The Prize (novel), a 1962 novel by Irving Wallace 
 The Prize (1963 film), a 1963 film based on the novel
 The Prize (1950 film), a 1950 French film
 The Prize (2011 film), a 2011 Mexican film
  
 "The Prize" (Young Hercules), a 1998 episode of the TV series
 The Prize: The Epic Quest for Oil, Money, and Power, a 1991 book by Daniel Yergin
 "The Prize", a song on Guster's album Parachute (album)
 The Prize, a 1977 album by the Alwyn Wall Band; see Malcolm and Alwyn
 The Prize, a 2012 album by Jakwob

See also
 Eyes on the Prize, a documentary about the American civil rights movement
Prize (disambiguation)
The Price (disambiguation)